The 2018 All England Open, officially the Yonex All England Open Badminton Championships 2018, was a badminton tournament which took place at Arena Birmingham in England from 14 to 18 March 2018. It had a total purse of $1 million.

Tournament
The 2018 All England Open was the seventh tournament of the 2018 BWF World Tour and also part of the All England Open championships, which has been held since 1899. This tournament was organized by Badminton England and sanctioned by the BWF. It was also the first ever new Super 1000 Level 2 tournament of the BWF World Tour schedule.

Venue
This international tournament was held at Arena Birmingham in Birmingham, England.

Point distribution
Below is the point distribution for each phase of the tournament based on the BWF points system for the BWF World Tour Super 1000 event.

Prize money
The total prize money for this year's tournament was US$1,000,000. Distribution of prize money was in accordance with BWF regulations.

Men's singles

Seeds

 Viktor Axelsen (withdrew)
 Lee Chong Wei (quarterfinals)
 Srikanth Kidambi (second round)
 Chen Long (quarterfinals)
 Son Wan-ho (semifinals)
 Lin Dan (final)
 Shi Yuqi (champion)
 Chou Tien-chen (first round)

Finals

Top half

Section 1

Section 2

Bottom half

Section 3

Section 4

Women's singles

Seeds

 Tai Tzu-ying (champion)
 Akane Yamaguchi (final)
 Ratchanok Intanon (first round)
 P. V. Sindhu (semifinals)
 Carolina Marín (quarterfinals)
 Sung Ji-hyun (first round)
 Nozomi Okuhara (quarterfinals)
 Chen Yufei (semifinals)

Finals

Top half

Section 1

Section 2

Bottom half

Section 3

Section 4

Men's doubles

Seeds

 Marcus Fernaldi Gideon / Kevin Sanjaya Sukamuljo (champions)
 Mathias Boe / Carsten Mogensen (final)
 Li Junhui / Liu Yuchen (quarterfinals)
 Liu Cheng / Zhang Nan (first round)
 Takeshi Kamura / Keigo Sonoda (first round)
 Mads Conrad-Petersen / Mads Pieler Kolding (semifinals)
 Chen Hung-ling / Wang Chi-lin (quarterfinals)
 Lee Jhe-huei / Lee Yang (second round)

Finals

Top half

Section 1

Section 2

Bottom half

Section 3

Section 4

Women's doubles

Seeds

 Chen Qingchen / Jia Yifan (quarterfinals)
 Misaki Matsutomo / Ayaka Takahashi (quarterfinals)
 Kamilla Rytter Juhl / Christinna Pedersen (champions)
 Yuki Fukushima / Sayaka Hirota (final)
 Shiho Tanaka / Koharu Yonemoto (semifinals)
 Greysia Polii / Apriyani Rahayu (first round)
 Lee So-hee / Shin Seung-chan (quarterfinals)
 Jongkolphan Kititharakul / Rawinda Prajongjai (quarterfinals)

Finals

Top half

Section 1

Section 2

Bottom half

Section 3

Section 4

Mixed doubles

Seeds

 Tontowi Ahmad / Liliyana Natsir (second round)
 Wang Yilü / Huang Dongping (quarterfinals)
 Tang Chun Man / Tse Ying Suet (first round)
 Praveen Jordan / Debby Susanto (quarterfinals)
 Zheng Siwei / Huang Yaqiong (final)
 Mathias Christiansen / Christinna Pedersen (semifinals)
 Chris Adcock / Gabrielle Adcock (quarterfinals)
 Zhang Nan / Li Yinhui (semifinals)

Finals

Top half

Section 1

Section 2

Bottom half

Section 3

Section 4

References

External links
 Tournament Link
 Official Website

All England Open Badminton Championships
All England Open
All England
All England
International sports competitions in Birmingham, West Midlands